Nemi is a town and commune in Rome

Nemi may refer to:
 Neminatha, 22nd Jain Tirthankara
 Nemi (comic strip), Norwegian comic strip
 Nemi language, New Caledonian language
 Northeastern Manitoulin and the Islands, a municipality in Canada